Rudolf Patrick (Rudi) Holzapfel (11 December 1938 in Paris, France – 6 February 2005 in Bonn, Germany) was an Irish poet and teacher.

Early life
His father, Rudolf Melander Holzapfel (1900–1982), was a Shakespeare scholar, expert on Old Master paintings, and art dealer. His mother, Mona Trew Holzapfel (1914–1998), was an original member of the renowned Bluebell Girls at the Folies Bergère. The Parisian dance troupe, founded in 1932 by the Dublin born Margaret Kelly (1910–2004), continues to perform elaborate shows at the Lido de Paris. The family relocated to America, living in California between 1946 to 1956, where Rudi Holzapfel graduated from Santa Barbara Catholic High School.

Education
From 1956 to 1970, Holzapfel worked various jobs in England and Ireland, and studied - attaining a M. Litt. with his thesis "Irish Literary Periodicals from 1900 to the Present Day" (1964) -  at Trinity College, Dublin, where he edited Icarus. It was during these years that Holzapfel began to identify with Ireland and the cause of Irish nationalism; he has said he would like to be considered a true inheritor of the spiritual legacy of the Gaelic Bards. He began a lifelong study and appreciation of James Clarence Mangan (1803–1849), who he describes as the greatest Irish poet before Yeats. In 1969, Holzapfel published James Clarence Mangan: A Checklist of Printed and Other Sources (Dublin: Scepter).

Career
From 1970 to the late 1980s, Holzapfel lived in Germany, teaching English and Literature, especially at the Emil-Fischer-Gymnasium in Euskirchen. Holzapfel has published more than twenty-five books of poetry, some under his own imprint, Sunburst Press (Blackrock, County Dublin). An early book of poetry, Cast a Cold Eye, was written with Brendan Kennelly (Dolmen Press, 1959). Holzapfel has published with other Irish authors, including Oliver Snoddy and John Farrell, and his work has been anthologized in the Penguin Book of Irish Verse and Modern Irish Poets. With a circle of other Mangan scholars, including Jacques Chuto, Peter Van de Kamp, Peter MacMahon, and Ellen Shannon-Mangan, Holzapfel has edited selections of Mangan's prose and poems for the Irish Academic Press.

Rudi Holzapfel died in Bonn, Germany, on 6 February 2005. His grave is to be found at the Poppelsdorfer Friedhof. His final book of Sonnets, A Tiger Says His Prayers, was published posthumously in 2006.

Works 
 Cast a Cold Eye, 1959, with Brendan Kennelly
 Romances [by "rooan hurkey"], 1960, Sunburst Press
 The Rain, the Moon, 1961, with Brendan Kennelly
 The Dark About Our Loves, 1962, with Brendan Kennelly
 Poems: Green Townlands (Leeds), 1963, with Brendan Kennelly
 Transubstantiations, 1963
 The Leprechaun [by "R. Patrick Ward"], 1963
 Why Hitler is in Heaven (satirical ballad), 1964
 Nollaig by Rudi Holzappel [sic] and Oliver Snoddy, 1964
 Translations From The English, 1965, The Museum Bookshop, Dublin
 The Rebel Bloom, Leeds, 1967
 For Love of Ireland (Broadsheet with 9 poems), [the author], Leeds, 1967
 No Road beyond Vallombrosa, 1968
 Parasites Lost, (Rudi Patrick Sebastian Holzapfel and John Joseph Conleth Farrell), 1970, Privately Printed, Cork
 Soledades, n.d., [1974], Sunburst Press
 Whom a Dream Hath Possessed, 1975, Sunburst Press
 A Smile Dies, 1978, Sunburst Press
 Repeat after me [with Hermann Brunken], 1980, Woodway Press, Euskirchen
 Poems Written Swiftly, 1982, Sunburst Press
 Buckshot (Aphorisms), 1983
 Turning and Manipulation, 1986, Sunburst Press
 Ask Silence Why, 1961-1982, selected poems edited by Ellen Shannon-Mangan, Dublin, 1987, Beaver Row Press
 The Light of Loss, December 1987, Sunburst Press
 And Other Poems, 1987, Pioneer Printing, New York
 White Alligators, 1991, Sunburst Press
 For Ronnie, 1993 (single leaf - to be read at the graveside)
 An Cheapach, 1993, Sunburst Press
 Dark Harvest, 1997, Sunburst Press
 Sonnets, 2001, Sunburst Press
 The Thieves of Dream, 2003, Sunburst Press
 A Tiger Says His Prayers, 2006, Sunburst Press

References
 Rudi Holzapfel A Bibliographical Checklist, foreword by Alraune Graefin Boesewicht, 1971, Triest.

External links
 http://www.lib.udel.edu/ud/spec/findaids/holzapf.htm

Irish poets
1938 births
2005 deaths
20th-century poets